Kiran (also Kira and Kiren) is a village in the Tovuz Rayon of Azerbaijan.  

Populated places in Tovuz District